Atila, as a given name, is an alternative spelling of Attila, the fifth century ruler of the Huns. It may also refer to:

People
Spelling of Attila (name) in Turkish, Spanish, Serbian (Serbian Cyrillic : Атила) and Átila in Portuguese 
Atila Turan (born 1992), Turkish footballer who currently plays for French Ligue 1 club Stade de Reims
Átila Abreu (born 1987), Brazilian racing driver
Atila Huseyin, British jazz singer of Turkish Cypriot origin
Atila Kasaš (born 1968), Serbian footballer of Hungarian origin

Other uses
Atila, an 1876 Spanish play by Enrique Gaspar
Atila (band), Spanish band
Atila, a nickname for the Argentine detention center Mansión Seré

See also
Attila (406–453), ruler of the Huns
ATILA, Finite element analysis software
Atilla (disambiguation)